The 1908 Purdue Boilermakers football team was an American football team that represented Purdue University during the 1908 college football season. In their first season under head coach Frederick A. Speik, the Boilermakers compiled a 4–3 record, finished in a tie for fourth place in the Western Conference with a 1–3 record against conference opponents, and outscored their opponents by a total of 124 to 78. Asher E. Holloway was a team captain.

Schedule

References

Purdue
Purdue Boilermakers football seasons
Purdue Boilermakers football